Andy Preston (born 31 July 1966) is an English politician, charity chairman, and businessman. He was elected Mayor of Middlesbrough in May 2019. He previously stood for the role of elected mayor of Middlesbrough in 2015. He was previously well known on Teesside as a high-profile philanthropist, having enjoyed a successful career in the town.

Charity work

After retiring from fund management, Preston moved back to the North of England. Between 2002 and 2008 Preston was a patron of international children's charity ARK. He was also chairman of charity Fairbridge Teesside from 2005 to 2010. The first charity he founded, in 2011, was Middlesbrough and Teesside Philanthropic Foundation which raises and distributes funds to boost communities across the urban area of Teesside.

An early supporter and trustee of the charity was public relations executive Mark Bolland The Foundation is supported by a number of local businesses including Middlesbrough Football Club, Steve Gibson's Bulkhaul and Cleveland Cable Company. It has also won support from Olympic long jumper Chris Tomlinson. After being elected mayor of Middlesbrough, Preston stood down from his role as chairman of the Foundation, relinquishing any decision-making role in the charity's activities but continuing in an honorary role of founder. By this time the charity had raised more than £3 million.
  
A couple of years after launching the Philanthropic Foundation, Preston launched a new charity called CEO Sleepout which holds events across the UK to raise funds to combat homelessness and poverty.  
In December 2016 Preston launched a charity restaurant, The Fork in the Road, in Middlesbrough with the goal of providing employment opportunities for ex-offenders, recovering addicts and the long term unemployed. A number of the Fork in the Road restaurant’s staff came through a programme designed to offer precious opportunities to those who need a helping hand – recovering addicts, ex-offenders and the long-term unemployed. The fit-out costs and working capital for this social enterprise came from CEO Sleepout charity and Public Health England. Preston transferred the Fork in the Road from CEO Sleepout to another local charity, Recovery Connections, after being elected mayor of Middlesbrough in 2019

Preston previously chaired Tees Valley Education, an academy trust operating in some of the UK's most disadvantaged areas.

Business

Andy Preston has been involved in numerous businesses in North East England and also invests in commercial property. He and his brother Chris restored the former Kirby College in Middlesbrough, converting it into apartments. In 2013, through a £1 million renovation they also converted a 19th-century Middlesbrough building previously known as the Cleveland Club into office accommodation called Boho Four Gibson House. He has also invested in a number of start-up businesses in the North East of England.

Politics

Andy Preston was historically an active member of Labour Party. In 2013 he spearheaded a successful campaign to retain the role of elected mayor of Middlesbrough when then Mayor Ray Mallon called a referendum on the position. Preston stood for election as an independent in 2015 to become elected mayor of Middlesbrough, narrowly losing out to Labour's Dave Budd. In 2016 Preston took up a voluntary role as Tees Valley business ambassador for the Britain Stronger in Europe campaign ahead of the referendum to decide whether the country should remain or leave the European Union. After being linked as a potential candidate to become the first Tees Valley Mayor, Preston ruled himself out of the race but warned against the election of a "career politician".

Preston was elected as Mayor of Middlesbrough on 2 May 2019, after running as an independent. He won in the first round with 59% (17,418) of the votes counted, with Labour's Mick Thompson coming second with 6,693 votes.

Personal life

Preston and his wife have lived at Otterington Hall, a grade II-listed mansion near Northallerton, since at least 2007. It has "one of the best topiary gardens in England and certainly the best in Yorkshire".

In 2015, Preston was criticised for using his parents' Middlesbrough address on his nomination papers, rather than that of his actual home, but he denied breaking election rules.

References

English businesspeople
Living people
1966 births
People from Middlesbrough
Mayors of Middlesbrough
Independent politicians in England